The 1985 Men's European Volleyball Championship was the fourteenth edition of the event, organized by Europe's governing volleyball body, the Confédération Européenne de Volleyball. It was hosted in several cities in the Netherlands from September 29 to October 4, 1985.

Teams

Group A – Voorburg

Group B – Zwolle

Group C – Den Bosch

Preliminary round

Final round

Final ranking

References
 Results

Men's European Volleyball Championships
E
Volleyball Championship
V
Men's European Volleyball Championship
Men's European Volleyball Championship